Guiot or Guyot is an Old French name, an augmentative of Guy. It may also be related to the root guille, meaning deception or silliness.

People with the given name
Guiot de Dijon (fl. 1215–1225), Burgundian trouvère
Guiot or Guyot du Repaire (1755–1818), French Army general
Guiot de Provins (fl. 1180–1208), French poet and trouvère

People with the surname
 Andréa Guiot (1928–2021), French soprano
 Nicolas Bernard Guiot de Lacour (1771–1809), French Army general
 Raymond Guiot (born 1930), French musician
 Arnold Henry Guyot (1807–1884), Swiss-American geologist and geographer
 Géo-Charles (born Charles Louis Proper Guyot; 1892–1963), French poet and gold medallist at the 1924 Summer Olympics
 Charles Guyot (cyclist, born 1890) (1890–1958), Swiss cyclist
 Charles Guyot (cyclist, born 1925) (1925–1973), Swiss cyclist
 Christophe Guyot (born 1962), French Superbike competitor
 Claude Guyot (born 1947), French cyclist
 Claude-Étienne Guyot (1768–1837), French general
 Cyril Guyot (born 1980), French footballer
 Éric Guyot (born 1962), French cyclist
 Jean Guyot (1512-1588), Franco-Flemish renaissance composer 
 Jules Guyot (1807–1872), French physician and agronomist
 Laurent Guyot (born 1969), French footballer and manager
 Lawrence Guyot (1939–2012), American civil rights activist
 Régis Guyot (born 1949), French civil servant (prefect)
 René Guyot (fl. 1882–1900), French Olympic trap shooter
 Sarah Guyot (born 1991), French sprint canoeist
 Sébastienne Guyot (1896–1941), French engineer and Olympic athlete
 Virginie Guyot (born 1976), French Air Force fighter pilot
 Yves Guyot (1843–1928), French politician and economist.

See also
 Guyot (disambiguation)

References